Palmetto Court is a bungalow court located at 100 Palmetto Dr. in Pasadena, California. The court consists of twelve single-family homes arranged along two central pathways with a two-unit building at the end of the paths. A torii-like gate is located at the court's street entrance. Contractor A. C. Parlee built the court in 1915. The homes in the court are designed in the American Craftsman style and feature both shingle and clapboard siding and a variety of roof styles including jerkinhead, gable, and shed.

The court was added to the National Register of Historic Places on July 11, 1983.

References

External links

Bungalow courts
Bungalow architecture in California
Houses in Pasadena, California
Houses completed in 1915
Houses on the National Register of Historic Places in California
National Register of Historic Places in Pasadena, California
American Craftsman architecture in California